Xiangjiang Middle Road station is a subway station in Changsha, Hunan, China, operated by the Changsha subway operator Changsha Metro.

Station layout
The station has one island platform.

History
The station opened on 29 April 2014.

Surrounding area

Huogong Palace (Chinese: 火宫殿)
Tianxin Pavilion (Chinese: 天心阁)
Dufu Pavilion (Chinese: 杜甫江阁)
Former Residence of Jia Yi

References

External links

Railway stations in Hunan
Railway stations in China opened in 2014